Neoxyphinus is a genus of spiders in the family Oonopidae. It was first described in 1953 by Birabén. , it contains 48 species.

Species
Neoxyphinus comprises the following species:

Neoxyphinus almerim Feitosa & Bonaldo, 2017 - Brazil
Neoxyphinus amazonicus Moss & Feitosa, 2016 - Brazil
Neoxyphinus axe Abrahim & Brescovit, 2012 - Brazil
Neoxyphinus barreirosi Abrahim & Bonaldo, 2012 - Colombia, Venezuela, Guyana, Brazil
Neoxyphinus belterra  Feitosa & Ruiz, 2017 - Brazil
Neoxyphinus beni Moss & Feitosa, 2016 - Bolivia
Neoxyphinus boibumba Abrahim & Rheims, 2012 - Brazil
Neoxyphinus cachimbo Feitosa & Moss, 2017 - Brazil
Neoxyphinus cantareira Feitosa & Ruiz, 2017 - Brazil
Neoxyphinus capiranga Feitosa & Moss, 2017 - Brazil
Neoxyphinus caprichoso Feitosa & Ruiz, 2017 - Brazil
Neoxyphinus carigoblin Feitosa & Moss, 2017 - Brazil
Neoxyphinus cavus Feitosa & Bonaldo, 2017 - Brazil
Neoxyphinus caxiuana Feitosa & Moss, 2017 - Brazil
Neoxyphinus celluliticus Feitosa & Ruiz, 2017 - Brazil
Neoxyphinus coari Feitosa & Moss, 2017 - Brazil
Neoxyphinus coca Moss & Feitosa, 2016 - Ecuador
Neoxyphinus crasto Feitosa & Moss, 2017 - Brazil
Neoxyphinus ducke Feitosa & Moss, 2017 - Brazil
Neoxyphinus furtivus (Chickering, 1968) - Jamaica, Trinidad, Brazil	
Neoxyphinus garantido Feitosa & Moss, 2017 - Brazil
Neoxyphinus gregoblin Abrahim & Santos, 2012 - Venezuela
Neoxyphinus hispidus (Dumitrescu & Georgescu, 1987) - Venezuela
Neoxyphinus inca Moss & Ruiz, 2016 - Peru
Neoxyphinus jacareacanga Feitosa & Moss, 2017 - Brazil
Neoxyphinus keyserlingi (Simon, 1907) - Brazil
Neoxyphinus macuna Moss & Ruiz, 2016 - Columbia
Neoxyphinus meurei Feitosa & Moss, 2017 - Brazil
Neoxyphinus murici Feitosa & Moss, 2017 - Brazil
Neoxyphinus mutum Feitosa & Moss, 2017 - Brazil
Neoxyphinus novalima Feitosa & Moss, 2017 - Brazil
Neoxyphinus ornithogoblin Feitosa & Moss, 2017 - Brazil
Neoxyphinus paraiba Feitosa & Moss, 2017 - Brazil
Neoxyphinus paraty Feitosa & Moss, 2017 - Brazil
Neoxyphinus petrogoblin Abrahim & Ott, 2012 - Colombia, Ecuador, Peru, Brazil
Neoxyphinus pure Moss & Bonaldo, 2016 - Colombia
Neoxyphinus rio Feitosa & Moss, 2017 - Brazil
Neoxyphinus saarineni Moss & Bonaldo, 2016 - Venezuela
Neoxyphinus sax Feitosa & Moss, 2017 - Brazil
Neoxyphinus simsinho Feitosa & Moss, 2017 - Brazil
Neoxyphinus stigmatus Feitosa & Moss, 2017 - Brazil
Neoxyphinus termitophilus (Bristowe, 1938) - Brazil, Argentina
Neoxyphinus trujillo Moss & Bonaldo, 2016 - Venezuela
Neoxyphinus tucuma Feitosa & Moss, 2017 - Brazil
Neoxyphinus tuparro Moss & Ruiz, 2016 - Colombia
Neoxyphinus xyphinoides (Chamberlin & Ivie, 1942) - Guyana
Neoxyphinus yacambu Moss & Feitosa, 2016 - Venezuela
Neoxyphinus yekuana Moss & Feitosa, 2016 - Venezuela

References

Oonopidae
Araneomorphae genera
Spiders of South America